Wendong Wa Ethnic Township is an ethnic township in Lancang Lahu Autonomous County, Yunnan, China.

Etymology
The name "Wen" and "Dong" were place name of Wa language and Dai language, respectively. "Wen" means a stockaded village in Wa language. "Dong" means a village with little flat land.

Administrative division
As of 2016, the township is divided into six villages: 
Xiaozhai
Bangyou
Pasai
Shuitang
Mangnuo
Duoyishu

History
In 1940, it came under the jurisdiction of the 6th District. That same year, the 6th District was revoked and the Wendong Township was set up. 

After the founding of the Communist State, it was renamed "Wendeng District". In 1958, its name was changed to "Wendong Commune". In 1988, Wendong Wa Ethnic Township was officially incorporated.

Geography
Wendong Wa Ethnic Township is located in northern Lancang Lahu Autonomous County. The township shares a border with Shangyun Town to the west and south, Fudong Township to the east, and Shuangjiang County to the north.

The Mangnuo River and Bangying River flow through the township.

Economy
The economy of the township has a predominantly agricultural orientation, including farming and pig-breeding. Grain, corn, sugarcane, and tea are the economic plants of this region.

Demographics

As of 2017, the National Bureau of Statistics of China estimates the township's population now to be 14,471.

Transportation
The National Highway G214 passes across the township north to south.

References

Bibliography

Townships of Pu'er City
Divisions of Lancang Lahu Autonomous County